Gansi is the second single from Edo Maajka's fourth studio album "Balkansko a naše".

About 
Gansi, the name itself is a reference to the American rock group Guns N' Roses and, is an ironic way in remembering Zagreb in the early 90s around the immortal club "Jabuka". The time before and after the Croatian military operation "Oluja". The plot revolves around a girl named Jasna, who Edo uses to describe the scene at the time. Jasna was more or less a gold digger. The song was produced by Koolade and interpolates "Sweet Child of Mine" by Guns N' Roses.

Music video 
The video shows the club Jabuka, showing us a number of different looks that sang at that club, from rock to rap, all of which Edo was dressed up for to star in.  There are also a number of cameo appearance by "night birds" from that time, which the songs mentions.

2008 songs
Edo Maajka songs